Pundalik or Pundarik is a central figure in the legends of the Hindu God Vithoba, generally considered a Vaishnava deity identified with the deities Vishnu and Krishna. He is credited to have brought Vithoba to Pandharpur, where Vithoba's central shrine stands today. Pundalik is also perceived to be the historical founder of the Varkari sect, which is centered on the worship of Lord Vithoba.

Pundalik was one of the earliest Kundalini Yoga practitioners. As He was the master of Kundalini Yoga, people used to call him "Kundalik". 
Later, after several years, Kundalik become Pundalik. He symbolised Kundalini energy in the form of Lord Vitthal also known as Lord Pandurang after his name Pundalik. 
Pandharpur's Vitthal was an incarnation of Lord Vishnu or Lord Krishna. According to legends it also depicts the symbol of the Kundalini Energy, although spiritually, the same energy dwells in all.

The brick on which Lord Vitthal is standing is the basic chakra of Kundalini energy known as Muladhara Chakra. Both hands, like bows, represents Ida and Pingla nadis which cross over at the central body of Sushumna or Brahma nadi. Body represents purusha means Vishnu or Krishna and the tilaka or the mark on the head represents Ajna Chakra or  guru chakra or third-eye chakra is the subtle center of energy, believed to be located between the eyebrows, located behind it along the subtle (non-physical) spinal column, as said by Lord Krishna in Bhagavad Gita.

Many Kings and other noblemen were devotees of Pundalik and they built the famous Vitthal temple at Pandharpur. The age old practice of the Kundalini Yoga converted the shrine into a holy place and truth seekers from all over the world were directed here by the divine to activate and raise their Kundalini energy by the very natural process of Bhakti, the highest form of Love anyone can express.

Historicity
Pundalik is commonly perceived to be a historical figure, connected with the establishment and propagation of the Vithoba-centric Varkari sect. Ramakrishna Gopal Bhandarkar considers Pundalik to be the founder of the Varkari sect and the one who promulgated the sect in Maratha country. Frazer, Edwards and P.R. Bhandarkar (1922) all suggest that Pundalik tried to unify Shiva and Vishnu, and that this culture originated in Karnataka. Ranade (1933) thinks that Pundalik, a Kannada saint, was not only the founder of the Varkari culture but also the first great devotee or first high priest of the Pandharpur temple. Upadhyaya supports the priest theory but declines the Kannada origin theory. Tulpule also accepted the theory that Pundalik was the historical founder of the Varkari sect, though declines to fix a date for him due to "lack of authentic evidence". According to M. S. Mate, Pundalik was instrumental in coaxing the Hoysala king Vishnuvardhana to build the Pandharpur temple to Vishnu, placing him in the early 12th century. Deleury (1960) believes Pundalik was a mystic, influenced by the Vaishnava Haridasa sect of Karnataka, who brought a drastic change in the worship of Vithoba. Pundalik not only founded the Varkari sect, but also was the first to identify Vithoba with the god Vishnu. Pundalik's fame also led to naming of Pandharpur to Paundrika-kshetra - the sacred place of Pundalik.

Other scholars like Raeside (1965), Dhanpalvar (1972), and Vaudeville (1974) have questioned the historicity of Pundalik altogether, and dismissed him as a mythical figure. In his analysis of the text Panduranga mahatmya by Sridhar (discussed in "Legend" section ahead), Raeside says that the legend of devotee Pundalik could have been nothing more a derivative of Puranic legend. Dhanpalvar strongly agreed with this possibility. Vaudeville found the legend of the Pundalik of Pandharpur was very similar to the legend of Pundarik, the devotee of Vishnu, in the Hindu epic Mahabharata. The religious historian R.C. Dhere, winner of the Sahitya Akademi Award for his book Sri Vitthal: Ek Mahasamanvaya, opines that identification of Vithoba with Vishnu led to conversion of the Shaiva (related to god Shiva) Pundarika shrine to the Vaishnava shrine of the devotee Pundalik. The main argument of the hypothesis is that the memorial shrine of Pundalik is a Shaiva shrine, rather than a Vaishnava one, compromising of a Shiva-linga, the symbol of god Shiva.

Legends

Texts, that narrate the legend of Pundalik and Vithoba, can be categorised into the Varkari tradition, the Brahmin tradition and what Raeside calls a "third tradition", that includes both Varkari and Brahmin elements. The Varkari texts are written in Marathi, the Brahmin texts in Sanskrit, and the "third tradition" are Marathi texts written by Brahmins.

The Varkari texts are: Bhaktalilamrita and Bhaktavijaya by Mahipati, Pundalika-Mahatmya by Bahinabai, and a long abhanga by Namdev. All these texts describe the legend of Pundalik. The Brahmin texts include: two versions of Panduranga-Mahatmya from the Skanda Purana (consisting of 900 verses); Panduranga-Mahatmya from the Padma Purana (consisting of 1,200 verses); Bhima-Mahatmya, also from the Padma Purana; and a third devotional work, yet again called Panduranga-Mahatmya, which is found in the Vishnu Purana. The "third tradition" is found in two works: Panduranga-Mahatmya by the Brahmin Sridhara (consisting of 750 verses), and another work of the same name written by Prahlada Maharaj (consisting of 181 verses).

There are three versions of the Pundalik legend, two of which are attested as textual variants of the Skanda Purana (1.34–67). According to the first, the ascetic Pundarika (Pundalik) is described as a devotee of god Vishnu and dedicated to the service of his parents. The god Gopala-Krishna, a form of Vishnu, comes from Govardhana as a cowherd, accompanied by his grazing cows, to meet Pundarika. Krishna is described as in digambar form, wearing makara-kundala, the srivatsa mark, a head-dress of peacock feathers, resting his hands on his hips and keeping his cow-stick between his thighs. Pundarika asks Krishna to remain in this form on the banks of the river Chandrabhaga. He believes that Krishna's presence will make the site a tirtha (a holy place near a water body) and a kshetra (a holy place near a temple). The location is identified with modern-day Pandharpur, which is situated on the banks of the Chandrabhaga. The description of Krishna resembles the characteristics of the Pandharpur image of Vithoba.

The second version of the legend depicts Vithoba appearing before Pundalik as the five-year-old Bala Krishna (infant Krishna). This version is found in manuscripts of both Puranas, Prahlada Maharaj, and the poet-saints, notably Tukaram. The remaining version of the Pundalik legend appears in Sridhara and as a variant in the Padma Purana. Pundalik, a Brahmin madly in love with his wife, neglected his aged parents as a result. Later, on meeting sage Kukkuta, Pundalik underwent a transformation and devoted his life to the service of his aged parents. Meanwhile, one day, Krishna comes to the forest Dandivana, near Pundalik's house, in search of his angry wife Rukmini, who has left him. After some coaxing, Rukmini was pacified. Then Krishna visited Pundalik and found Pundalik serving his parents. Pundalik threw a brick outside for Krishna to stand on. Krishna stood on the brick and waited for Pundalik. After completing his services, Pundalik asked that his Lord, in the Vithoba form - waiting arms-akimbo on the brick, remain on the brick with Rukmini, in Rakhumai form, and bless his devotees forever.

See also
 Panduranga Mahatyam, 1957 Telugu film based on his life story.

Notes

References

 
 
 
 
 
 

Warkari
Characters in Hindu mythology